Franck Delhem (2 May 1936 – 20 January 2020) was a Belgian fencer. He competed in the individual and team foil events at the 1960 Summer Olympics.

References

External links
 

1936 births
2020 deaths
Belgian male fencers
Belgian foil fencers
Olympic fencers of Belgium
Fencers at the 1960 Summer Olympics
Sportspeople from Antwerp